I. calvum may refer to:

Intrasporangium calvum, a Gram-positive bacterium.
Iseilema calvum, a species of grass in genus Iseilema